Carlos Roberto Cavalcanti de Albuquerque (born 1953), known as Robertinho do Recife, is a Brazilian guitarist, record producer, composer born in the city of Recife, Brazil. His first contact with the guitar was at the age of 10. After he was run over by a car, he had to stay long periods of time at home and had to watch a lot of TV. In one of these TV programs he met The Beatles and fell in love with the guitar. He got his first guitar as a gift from his grandfather. At the age of 12 he was already playing with bands in Recife. He had very good technique and later was invited to play with bands like: Watch Pocket, Chicago and Quiet Riot. He played a little of everything: from music for children, to heavy metal and neoclassical. At the end of the 1980s he played with the Brazilian band Yahoo, when they played a cover of "Love Bites", song from the British band Def Leppard. He's currently working as a music producer in his own studio in Rio de Janeiro.

Since the 1970s he has worked with artists like Geraldo Azevedo, Zé Ramalho and Raimundo Fagner.

Discography
 1977: Jardim da Infância
 1978:  Robertinho no Passo (featuring Hermeto Pascoal)
 1979:  E Agora pra Vocês... Suingues Tropicais
 1981:  Satisfação
 1982:  Robertinho do Recife e Emilinha
 1983:  Ah, Robertinho do Mundo
 1984:  Metal Mania
 1990:  Rapsódia Rock
 2014:  Back For More

References

1953 births
Living people
Brazilian composers
Brazilian guitarists
Brazilian male guitarists
People from Recife
Brazilian record producers